George Alfred Carlson (October 23, 1876 – December 6, 1926) was the 20th Governor of Colorado from 1915 to 1917.

Biography
He was born on October 23, 1876, in Alta, Iowa.

Carlson graduated from the University of Colorado in 1902 and earned his law degree there in 1904.  He practiced law in Fort Collins, Colorado, from 1905 to 1908, and was district attorney in Fort Collins from 1908 to 1914.  He ran for governor as a Republican in 1914 and won, benefiting from vote-splitting between Democrats and Progressives.

Carlson's administration was noted for labor reforms, including the passage of a workers' compensation law and the establishment of the Industrial Commission of Colorado.  He also supported and signed into law a prohibition bill making Colorado a "dry state."

Carlson was defeated for reelection in 1916.  After leaving office, he returned to law practice in Denver.

He died on December 6, 1926, in Denver, Colorado.

External links 
 
  State of Colorado biography
 George Alfred Carlson entry at the National Governors Association
 George Alfred Carlson entry at The Political Graveyard
 

1876 births
1926 deaths
Republican Party governors of Colorado
People from Buena Vista County, Iowa
University of Colorado alumni